See No Evil (released in the United Kingdom as Blind Terror) is a 1971 British-American psychological horror-thriller film directed by Richard Fleischer and starring Mia Farrow as a recently-blinded woman who is stalked by a psychopath while staying at her family's rural estate.

Plot
After being blinded in a horse riding accident, Sarah (Mia Farrow) visits her uncle's stately home. Out on a date with her boyfriend, Steve (Norman Eshley), she escapes the fate of her relatives (Dorothy Alison, Robin Bailey, and Diane Grayson), who are murdered at their home, along with the gardener, by a psychotic killer. Sarah returns from her date and spends the night in the house, unaware that three of her family members' corpses are strewn in various rooms.

Sarah eventually discovers the bodies. She also discovers a bracelet containing an engraved name on it, which she correctly assumes belongs to the killer. The killer returns to search for the lost bracelet. His face is only shown to the audience in the film's last scene, otherwise he is only shown from the knees down, wearing jeans and distinctive leather boots. He discovers Sarah, who manages to flee on horseback into the woods, where she meets and is saved by a family of gypsies.

When Sarah shows them the bracelet, they see the name "Jack" inscribed on it. This leads Tom (Michael Elphick), the head of the family, to conclude his brother, Jack, must be the murderer, as he was dating one of the murdered women from the estate. In an effort to save Jack, Tom pretends to take Sarah to the police but instead locks her in a secluded shed. His plan is to then round up the family and flee the area.

Sarah escapes from the shed and is found by Steve, out searching for her. She tells him all she knows. Steve and his men leave Sarah at his house to recuperate and begin a search for the killer, who they assume is a gypsy. They come across the two gypsy brothers and are about to assault them when a frantic Jack explains that his brother suspected him of being the killer because of the name on the bracelet. However Jack insists he had nothing to do with it. They look at the bracelet again and see the name on it is actually "Jacko".

Steve, upon learning the killer's real name, hurries away with his men. Back at his house it is revealed that Jacko is one of Steve's workers, left behind to guard Sarah. The killer, still searching for his lost bracelet, is stealthily going through the pockets of Sarah's clothes, left beside the tub while she is taking a bath. When she reaches for a towel she touches his hand. Both are momentarily startled, then Jacko attempts to drown Sarah in the bath. At the last possible moment, when it seems he has succeeded, Steve races in, just in time to save her.

Cast

Production

Development
Interviewed in 1997, writer Brian Clemens recalled that he wrote the script 'on spec' and Columbia Pictures told him: "'Well, if Mia Farrow plays the lead, we'll buy it,' and she read it and liked it, and so they bought it and we shot it.'" The film was a co-production of interests from the United Kingdom and the United States.

Filming
Filming took place in Berkshire, England, with a mainly British cast and crew.

Reception and criticism
Its theatrical release in the United States was 'a box office disappointment' and reviews were 'generally mixed'. The New York Times wrote:
"See No Evil has its share of thrills. Cheap thrills, to be sure, but thrills none the less - and everything in the rest of Richard Fleischer's new movie... encourages us to value small favors. Attempting on the one hand to mean something and on the other hand trying to crank up the terror, Fleischer keeps suggesting confrontations between the rich and the poor, the old and the young, families with daughters to protect and men with warped desires. For all the potency of a camera movement, it can never have exactly the power of a conceptual image, and therefore "See No Evil" is better with its mindless terror than with its witless meaning. And although everything becomes far too much long before it is over, the movie is generally at it most ridiculous precisely where it hopes to make sense."

"For sheer suspense", wrote The Palm Beach Post, it "may well be without peer", but, while praising the performance of Mia Farrow, considered the 'fiendish gamut' of injury her character is subjected to could 'only be called sadism'.

Screenwriter Brian Clemens was nominated for an Edgar Allan Poe Award.

Later reviewers have described the film as a 'creepy, atmospheric thriller', in the style of Terence Young's 1967 film Wait Until Dark, while critic John Derry highlights the way Mia Farrow is presented 'from the first moment' as 'the obvious victim'.

See No Evil made its US television premiere on NBC Monday Night at the Movies in January 1974.

See also
List of films featuring home invasions

References

External links
 
 
 

1971 films
1971 horror films
1970s crime drama films
1970s psychological thriller films
British psychological horror films
British psychological thriller films
British horror thriller films
British horror drama films
Crime horror films
British psychological drama films
Films about blind people
Films set in England
Films shot in England
Columbia Pictures films
Films directed by Richard Fleischer
Films scored by Elmer Bernstein
Films set in country houses
Home invasions in film
Filmways films
1971 drama films
1970s English-language films
1970s British films